Bec Stupak (born 1974) is a video and performance artist working in Brooklyn, New York. Her work uses collage, repetition and shifting fields of bright color to create psychedelic animations and films. She got her start early on as a VJ at raves, performing around the world and as a regular performer at Lonnie Fischer's Ultraworld events at the D.C. Armory.

She was named Art Director of New Media at Atlantic Records in 2000 and remained there until 2003, creating online content and overseeing websites for all Atlantic artists including Lil' Kim, T.I., Trick Daddy, Jewel, Brandy and many others. Stupak started working with the New York based collective Assume Vivid Astro Focus in 2002. Their first collaboration was Freebird, which was quickly followed by Walking on Thin Ice. In 2004, the collective was featured in the Whitney Biennial.

Stupak's first solo show, "Radical Earth Magic Flower", premiered in 2006 at Deitch Projects gallery in New York. The show featured a number of videos including her blind remake of Jack Smith's 1962 cult classic Flaming Creatures.

Stupak returned to Deitch Projects in 2007 for a one night engagement along with The Dazzle Dancers to premiere their music video collaboration "The Love Boat". Also in 2007, Stupak began a collaboration with the Joshua Light Show, which was originally the house lightshow at the Fillmore East in the 1960s.

References

External links
 Bec Stupak exhibition at Deitch Projects

Living people
VJs (media personalities)
American performance artists
1974 births